The 1953 UCI Road World Championships took place from 29-30 August 1953 in Lugano, Switzerland.

Events Summary

Medal table

References

 
UCI Road World Championships by year
W
R
International cycle races hosted by Switzerland